The Boston Jewish Film Festival (BJFF) is an annual film festival that screens the best contemporary films on Jewish themes from around the world. The festival presents features, shorts, documentaries, and conversations with visiting artists in order to explore the Jewish identity, the current Jewish experience and the richness of Jewish culture in relation to a diverse modern world.

History
Founded by filmmaker Michal Goldman in 1989, the Boston Jewish Film Festival has grown from 10 screenings to more than 60 throughout the Boston area including Brookline, Newton, Somerville and Cambridge venues such as the Museum of Fine Arts and the Coolidge Corner Theatre. In the past 30 years, the Festival has presented more than 800 films - many of them US or Massachusetts premieres – and welcomed hundreds of thousands of audience members. Many of the films that have been shown have gone on to be nominated for, or win, Academy Awards including The Pianist (winner, Best Director, Best Actor, and Best Adapted Screenplay, 2002), Nowhere in Africa (winner, Best Foreign Film, 2002) and The Personals (winner, Best Short-Subject Documentary, 1998).

Film submission criteria 
The Annual Festival is a non-competitive event, although since 2002 it has offered audience members the opportunity to cast ballots for favorite Documentary file, Feature Film and Short Film. It screens International and American independent films and videos that highlight the Jewish experience; deal with themes of Jewish culture, heritage or history; and films of particular interest to the Jewish community. The Festival also presents narrative, documentary, animated and experimental works. Projects must be completed in 35mm, 16mm, Beta or 1/2 inch format. They can be of any length, but must not have previously been screened in the Boston area.

Year-round programs 
Boston Jewish Film has grown from presenting films once a year at the annual festival to a flourishing year-round arts organization, with programs and screenings taking place nearly every month. Since 1998, the Festival has presented more than 275 films and welcomed another 75,000+ audience members outside the November Festival. This also includes a Summer Cinematheque series featuring new films presented in July and August.

Annual November festival 
The twelve day event each November showcasing the best contemporary films from around the world on Jewish themes, accompanied by visiting filmmakers, panel discussions, musical events and more.

Boston Israeli Film Festival 
For the first time in 2019, Boston Jewish Film presented the Boston Israeli Film Festival which included documentary, comedy, drama and children's films.

ReelAbilities Film Festival Boston 
In 2011, Boston Jewish Film became the host for ReelAbilities Boston, Boston’s disability film festival. Like Boston Jewish Film, ReelAbilities uses film to increase awareness and understanding in the community. ReelAbilities strives for inclusion of all people and is dedicated to promoting awareness and appreciation of the lives, stories, and artistic expressions of people with different abilities.

Pre-release and word-of-mouth screenings 
Boston Jewish Film often presents a special advance screening, sometimes with a visiting filmmaker or actor. Other times, members are offered free tickets to word-of-mouth screenings at a local theater. These screenings are chances to see films before the general public.

Co-presentations 
Boston Jewish Film works with other film festivals throughout the year to bring quality films to the Boston area. Recent and ongoing partners include the Boston French Film Festival, the Boston LGBT Film Festival, the Independent Film Festival of Boston and the Roxbury International Film Festival.

Curated series and programs 
From time to time, the Boston Jewish Film Festival curates a special series either independently or in conjunction with another organization. These series are often thematically-based and have included a series focusing on the question of censorship and freedom of expression as part of the New Center for Arts and Culture's multi-disciplinary citywide exhibition Words on Fire, as well as a series celebrating pioneering Jewish women in America in conjunction with Jewish Women’s Archive.

Recognition 
In 1999, the Boston Jewish Film Festival was named “Best Film Series” by the Boston Society of Film Critics.

In 2003, Artistic Director Kaj Wilson and Executive Director Sara Rubin were honored with Image Awards for Vision and Excellence by Women in Film & Video in New England.

In 2004, it hosted the 4th Conference of Jewish Film Festivals, welcoming Jewish Film Festival directors from around the globe to Boston.

In 2006, Executive Director Sara L. Rubin was recognized and honored for her career and her dedication to French culture by the French Minister of Culture by being introduced into France's Order of Arts and Letters, with the rank of Chevalier (Knight).

In 2007, departing Artistic Director Kaj Wilson was honored for her work by a commendation from the Boston Society of Film Critics.

Winners

External links
 Official website
 MVHC Summer Institute
 The Color of Film Collaborative
 Jewish Women's Archive
 Film Festivals . com - People

1989 establishments in Massachusetts
Film festivals in Boston
Jewish film festivals in the United States
Jews and Judaism in Boston
Film festivals established in 1989